The  is a professional wrestling tag team championship owned by the Joshi puroresu (women's professional wrestling) promotion Gatoh Move Pro Wrestling. Though Gatoh Move is a joshi puroresu promotion, this title has no gender restriction. Like most professional wrestling championships, the title is won via the result of a scripted match.

There have been a total of 10 reigns shared between nine different teams consisting of fourteen distinctive champions. The current title holders are Chris Brookes and Masahiro Takanashi who are in the first reign as a team.

Reigns

Combined reigns

By team

By wrestler

References

External links 
 Gatoh Move's official site in Japanese

Tag team wrestling championships
Women's professional wrestling tag team championships